Vista Equity Partners is an American investment firm focused on financing and forwarding software, data, and technology-enabled startup businesses. Vista has invested in hundreds of companies, including Misys, Ping Identity, and Marketo.

The company has offices in several cities, including Austin, Texas, New York City, and San Francisco.

History

2000–2009 
Vista Equity Partners was founded in 2000 by American businessman and investor Robert F. Smith, who serves as chairman and CEO. Vista opened its first office in San Francisco in 2000. In November 2008, the company closed a funding round for its first institutional fund with a total of $1.3 billion raised.

Vista is known for applying detailed scrutiny in human resources when investing in firms, in a procedure it calls Vista Standard Operating Procedures.

2010–2019 
In 2010, Brian N. Sheth was promoted to president and awarded the title of co-founder of the firm. He remained in this role until his departure in 2020.

In 2011, the company opened an office in Austin, Texas. Over the years, Vista has added several private equity funds and credit funds to its portfolio, including its first fund, the Vista Credit Opportunities Fund, which raised $196 million. During that time, Vista opened several funds that specifically target middle-market companies and emerging technology companies. The company also has a permanent capital investment fund, Vista Equity Partners Perennial, which focuses on growing vertical market software companies.

In 2018, Vista was named the top software investor of the past decade by Pitchbook. Also in 2018, Vista's sale of Marketo to Adobe was named Deal of the Year by Buyouts magazine. In 2019, Vista was named Dealmaker of the Year at the PitchBook Private Equity Awards.

2020–present 
As of May 2020, Vista had more than $57 billion in capital commitments. In 2020, Vista joined Diligent Corporation's modern leadership initiative and pledged to create five new board roles among its portfolio companies for racially diverse candidates.

As of June 2021, Vista had more than $81 billion in assets under management. In August 2021, its chief operating officer David Breach was announced as president of Vista, the previous incumbent, Brian N. Sheth, a Vista co-founder, resigning in 2020 following the criminal tax investigation of CEO Smith.

In January 2022, it was announced that Citrix Systems had been acquired in a $16.5 billion deal by affiliates of Vista and Evergreen Coast Capital. The all-cash acquisition will see Citrix merge with TIBCO, a Vista portfolio company.

In August 2022, Vista agreed to acquire tax automation software platform maker Avalara, Inc. for $8.4 billion including debt.

Tax evasion
In October 2020, Vista's CEO Robert F. Smith and investor Robert T. Brockman were named in a tax evasion case. That month, Smith signed a non-prosecution agreement with the IRS, agreeing to pay $139 million and testify against Brockman. The following month, Vista's president and co-founder Brian Sheth departed the company, stating that his leaving was unrelated to the tax situation.

Investments

2000–2009 
In August 2000, Vista invested in SourceNet Solutions, a provider of finance and accounting business process outsourcing services. Between 2001 an 2005, Vista invested in several software companies, including BigMachines, a provider of product configuration software, and Aspect Communications, a contact center technology company, among others. In 2004, Vista acquired Applied Systems, Inc., an insurance software company. In 2005, Vista invested in MDSI Mobile Data Solutions.

In 2006, Vista invested in Reynolds and Reynolds, an auto technology company. The following year, Vista acquired Indus International, which it later merged with MDSI Mobile Data Solutions to form Ventyx, Inc. That year, the company also invested in SirsiDynix, a library software company. In 2008, Vista acquired P2 Energy Solutions Inc, a software company that helps oil and gas producers keep track of drilling leases. The following year, the company acquired SumTotal Systems from Accel Partners and Kohlberg Kravis Roberts, as well as MicroEdge from Advent Software.

2010–2019 
In 2011, the firm acquired multiple companies, including Sage Healthcare, an electronic health records company, which it renamed Vitera Healthcare Solutions.

Between 2012 and 2013, Vista acquired companies including Bullhorn, Inc. a CRM software provider; Misys, a British software company; Websense; and Active Network, Inc, an online event registration service. Between 2014 and 2015, Vista acquired Automated Insights, a software company specializing in natural-language generation; Main Street Hub, a social-media company;  PowerSchool, a provider of educational technology, and TIBCO Software, a company that specializes in big data and software integrations, among others.

In 2016, Vista acquired Solera Holdings for $6.5 billion and Cvent for $1.65 billion, and announced agreements to acquire Marketo (marketing automation software), Ping Identity (single sign-on digital security), and GovDelivery (technology platform for government bodies). The company invested in Granicus and Vivid Seats that same year. Vista subsequently merged GovDelivery and Granicus into one company. In 2017, Vista acquired several software companies, including NAVEX Global. That year, the company also invested in Upserve, a restaurant software provider, and Market Track.

In 2018, Vista acquired Apptio, a cloud-based business management software, Alegeus, and entered into an agreement to acquire Mindbody for $1.9 billion. That year, Vista invested in several other companies, including Wrike, a provider of project management software. In 2019, Vista bought a majority stake in Acquia, and completed its first IPO when it took Ping Identity public. Also in 2019, Vista purchased Sonatype, a cybersecurity, open-source automation company and Accelya, a technology provider for the airline industry.

2020–present 
In 2020, Vista acquired Tripleseat, a web-based sales and event management company, and purchased a 2.32% stake in Jio Platforms. In November 2020, Vista acquired CRM-Software provider Pipedrive for $1.5 billion. In the same month, Vista also acquired Customer Success company Gainsight for $1.1 billion.

In April 2021, Vista completed its acquisition of Pluralsight for $22.50 per share.
In September 2021, Vista acquired a majority stake in Drift, a sales and marketing software company, valued at over $1.0 billion in the deal.
Also in September, Vista announced it intended to acquire Blue Prism for £1.095 billion ($1.5 billion), and to merge it into Tibco but Blue Prism was ultimately bought by SS&C Technologies in March 2022 for approximately $1.6 billion (£1.25 billion).

Divestments
In December 2004, Vista sold SourceNet Solutions to Mellon Financial.

Between 2010 and 2013, Vista sold several companies, including Ventyx to ABB Group for over $1 billion, BigMachines to Oracle for over $400 million, and P2 Energy Solutions to Advent International Corp. In September 2014, Vista announced the sale of MicroEdge to Blackbaud for $160 million. In 2015, the company sold Websense to Raytheon for $1.9 billion.

Between 2015 and 2020, Vista divested other companies, including selling BullHorn, Inc to Insight Venture Partners, selling parts of Active Network to Global Payments Inc. and selling NAVEX Global to BC Partners. During this time, Vista also sold SirsiDynix to ICV Partners, and Main Street Hub to GoDaddy for $125 million. In 2018, Vista sold Marketo to Adobe Systems for $4.75 billion.

In 2020, Vista sold Vertafore to Roper Technologies for $5.35 billion and Regulatory DataCorp to moody's for $700 million. In 2021, Vista divested from Aspira, a software provider and Numerator, a market intelligence firm Vista had backed since 2017. Also in 2021, Vista sold Allocate, which it acquired in 2018, to RLDatix for $1.3 billion.

Philanthropy
In September 2017, Vista and their companies pledged $1 million to assist the Akshaya Patra Foundation in delivering meals to Indian school children. In 2019, Robert F. Smith committed to eliminate the student loan debt of the Morehouse College Class of 2019. He paid $34 million to cover the students' loans and the loans of their parents for their studies.

References

External links
 

Financial services companies established in 2000
Companies based in San Francisco
Private equity firms of the United States
American companies established in 2000